Gabriel Leonard Dănuleasa (born 8 May 2003) is a Romanian professional footballer who plays as a centre back for Liga I side Farul Constanța.

Club career

Farul Constanta
He made his league debut on 18 July 2021 in Liga I match against UTA Arad.

Career statistics

Club

References

External links
 
 
 

2003 births
Living people
People from Călărași
Romanian footballers
Romania youth international footballers
Association football midfielders
Liga I players
FC Viitorul Constanța players
FCV Farul Constanța players